Hrdlořezy is name of several locations in the Czech Republic: 
Hrdlořezy (Prague) 
Hrdlořezy (Mladá Boleslav District)